The men's 81 kg competition of the 2013 World Judo Championships was held on August 29.

Medalists

Results

Pool A
First round fights

Pool B
First round fights

Pool C
First round fights

Pool D
First round fights

Finals

Repechage

References

External links
 
 Draw

M81
World Judo Championships Men's Half Middleweight